The 2004 Bulgarian Figure Skating Championships National Championships of the 2003–04 figure skating season. Skaters competed in the disciplines of men's singles, ladies' singles, pair skating, and ice dancing on the senior level.

The results were used to choose the teams to the 2004 World Championships and the 2004 European Championships.

Results

Men

Ladies

Pairs

Ice dancing

External links
 results

Bulgarian Figure Skating Championships, 2004